The traditional Māori greeting, the  is performed by two people pressing their noses together; some include, at the same time, the touching of foreheads. The greeting is used at traditional meetings among Māori people, and at major ceremonies, such as a pōwhiri. It may be followed by a handshake.

Symbolism
When Māori greet one another by pressing noses, the tradition of sharing the breath of life is considered to have come directly from the gods. In Māori mythology, woman was created by the gods moulding her shape out of the earth. The god Tāne embraced the figure and breathed into her nostrils. She then sneezed and came to life, creating the first woman in Māori legends, Hineahuone.

Examples
The  may be performed by Māori and non-Māori, and between New Zealanders and foreign visitors. Several British royals have been greeted with the  during visits to New Zealand, including: Prince Charles; Princess Diana; Duchess Camilla; Prince William and Kate Middleton; and Prince Harry and Meghan Markle. Former U.S. President Barack Obama exchanged a  during a visit to the country in March 2018.
The  is used in some churches as a way to share the sign of peace.

Similar practices

In Sabu Raijua, Indonesia, a similar greeting involving touching noses called Henge'do is practiced.

See also

 Cheek kissing
 Eskimo kissing, a similar gesture
 Māori culture

References

Greetings
Māori culture